1901 in the Philippines details events of note that happened in the Philippines in 1901

Incumbents

First Philippine Republic

President: Emilio Aguinaldo (until March 23)

U.S. Military Government
Governor:
 Arthur MacArthur, Jr. (until July)
 Adna Chaffee, Jr. (starting July)

Events

March
 March 2 – The Army Appropriation Act, also known as the Spooner Amendment, is passed by the US Senate.
 March 12 – The province of Tayabas is founded.
 March 16 – The province of Romblon is founded.
 March 18 – The province of Masbate is founded.
 March 23 – General Emilio Aguinaldo is captured in Palanan, Isabela by US authorities.

April
 April 1 – Aguinaldo takes an oath of allegiance to the US.

June
 June 17 – El Colegio de San Beda established.

July
 July 4
 Adna Chaffee appointed as the last US Military Governor (1901–1902).
 A civil government is established in the Philippines with William Howard Taft as the first Civil Governor (1901–1904).
 July 18 – The US organizes the Philippine Constabulary.
 July 31 – Manila becomes a city through the enactment of United States Philippine Commission Act 183.

August
 August 28 – Silliman Institute, later known as Silliman University, is established as the first American university in the Philippines

September
 September 27 – Guerillas, headed by the Filipino Captain Daza, attack the US military barracks in Balangiga, Samar
 September 28 – Balangiga massacre occurs

October
 October 20 – A U.S. Marine battalion arrives on Samar to conduct the March across Samar operation
 November 4 – The Philippine Commission enacts the Sedition Law
 December 14 – An earthquake estimated of magnitude 7.8 shakes Lucena, Tayabas (now Quezon province when re-established in 1946).

Unknown date
 September – The first Filipino members of the second Philippine Commission are appointed

Holidays
As a former colony of Spanish Empire and being a catholic country, the following were considered holidays:
 January 1 – New Year's Day
 April 4 – Maundy Thursday
 April 5 – Good Friday
 December 25 – Christmas Day

Reference